Im Hyuk (born Im Jung-hyuk; May 31, 1949) is a South Korean actor. Im has starred in television series since 1969, notably in historical dramas.

Filmography

Television series

Film

Awards and nominations

References

External links 
 
 
 

1949 births
Living people
South Korean male television actors
South Korean male film actors
Chung-Ang University alumni
Pungcheon Im clan